Ishmael Maluleke (born 7 July 1977) is a South African former soccer player.

Career

Maluleke's mother, pastor and speaker KS Maluleke, did not want him to play football as a child, fearing he would become crippled.

Despite wanting to sign for SuperSport United, Ajax Cape Town, and Dynamos instead, he joined Mamelodi Sundowns, the most successful team in South Africa from Manning Rangers through his agent, where he struggled to get game time.

In 2016, Maluleke said that "“Playing soccer was the toughest decision for me to take because I grew up in a family of Christians and the worst part is that while my mom was a pastor I had to play for teams that used muthi (witchcraft)".

References

External links
 

Living people
1977 births
South African soccer players
South Africa international soccer players
Association football forwards
Manning Rangers F.C. players
AmaZulu F.C. players
Mamelodi Sundowns F.C. players
South African Premier Division players
National First Division players